The Men's marathon 1A was a wheelchair marathon event in athletics at the 1988 Summer Paralympics. The race was won by Heinrich Koeberle.

Results

See also
 Marathon at the Paralympics

References 

Men's marathon 1A
1988 marathons
Marathons at the Paralympics
Men's marathons